The 2008–09 Swiss Challenge League was the sixth season of the Swiss Challenge League, the second tier of the Swiss football league pyramid. It began on 25 July 2008 and ended on 30 May 2009. The champions of this season, FC St. Gallen, earned promotion to the 2009–10 Super League. The two teams, FC Concordia Basel and FC La Chaux-de-Fonds, were administratively relegated to the 1. Liga due to the financial reasons.

Teams

League table

Top goal scorers
24 goals
 Vincenzo Rennella (Lugano)
22 goals
 Moreno Merenda (St. Gallen)
17 goals
 Franck Madou (Biel-Bienne)
15 goals
 Rainer Bieli (Concordia)
 Kamel Boughanem (Lausanne)
14 goals
 Moreno Costanzo (St. Gallen)
13 goals

 Dante Senger (FC Locarno)
12 goals
 David Blumer (Thun)
 Mbala Mbuta Biscotte (Yverdon-Sport)
11 goals
 Allmir Ademi (Schaffhausen)
 Tomo Barlecaj (Winterthur)
 Alain Schultz (Wohlen, until January)
 Bruno Valente (Lugano)
10 goals
 Milaim Rama (Thun)
 Silvio Carlos (Wil)
 Carlos da Silva (Lugano)

External links
 Swiss League Competitions

Swiss Challenge League seasons
2008–09 in Swiss football
Swiss